In enzymology, an UDP-glucuronate 4-epimerase is an enzyme that catalyzes the chemical reaction

UDP-glucuronate  UDP-D-galacturonate

Hence, this enzyme has one substrate, UDP-glucuronate, and one product, UDP-D-galacturonate.

This enzyme belongs to the family of isomerases, specifically those racemases and epimerases acting on carbohydrates and derivatives.  The systematic name of this enzyme class is UDP-glucuronate 4-epimerase. Other names in common use include uridine diphospho-D-galacturonic acid, UDP glucuronic epimerase, uridine diphosphoglucuronic epimerase, UDP-galacturonate 4-epimerase, uridine diphosphoglucuronate epimerase, and UDP-D-galacturonic acid 4-epimerase.  This enzyme participates in starch and sucrose metabolism and nucleotide sugars metabolism.

References

 

EC 5.1.3
Enzymes of unknown structure